Lucas Nunatak is a nunatak  south of the Woodberry Nunataks in the Casey Range of the Framnes Mountains, Antarctica. It was mapped by Norwegian cartographers from air photos taken by the Lars Christensen Expedition, 1936–37, and was visited by an Australian National Antarctic Research Expeditions party in April 1962. It was named by the Antarctic Names Committee of Australia for F.M. Lucas, officer in charge at Mawson Station in 1962.

References

Nunataks of Mac. Robertson Land